Lepas is a genus of goose barnacles in the family Lepadidae.

Species
Species in the genus include:
 Lepas anatifera Linnaeus, 1758
 Lepas anserifera Linnaeus, 1767
 Lepas australis Darwin, 1851
 Lepas hilli Leach, 1818
 Lepas indica Annandale, 1909
 Lepas pectinata Spengler, 1793
 Lepas testudinata Aurivillius, 1894

References

Barnacles
Maxillopoda genera
Taxa named by Carl Linnaeus